Palais Hoyos is an Art Nouveau building in the Landstraße district of Vienna, Austria.

History

The palace was built, together with two other buildings, by Otto Wagner at the end of the 19th century. The style of the Historicism was pursued during the realisation of the palace and the facade is Rococo and Vienna Secession (Art Nouveau).

Wagner kept the building in the middle, Rennweg 3 (Palais Hoyos), for himself, while Gustav Mahler lived in the adjacent building, Rennweg 5, from 1898 to 1909.

The site once housed the Trinity hospital and the barracks of the k. k. adelig-polnischen Leibgarde military unit, which were called the Arcièren-Leibgarde later on.

In 1903, the palace was bought by the widowed countess Marie Hoyos. The Hoyos family owned another palace in the Ringstraße, which is nowadays known as Hotel Bristol.

In 1957, the palace in Rennweg was sold by the Hoyos family to Yugoslavia, in order to serve as its embassy in Austria. After the breakup of Yugoslavia, the building became the possession of Serbia, serving the same purpose.

Following the agreement of Yugoslav successor states on the distribution of former country's foreign assets in 2011, the building passed on to Croatia.
In 2013, Croatian Ministry of Foreign Affairs started a major renovation (4.6 million kuna, or over 600,000 euro) in order to move the Croatian embassy there from Heuberggasse 10.

References

External links 

 Palais Hoyos auf burgen-austria.com

Buildings and structures in Landstraße
Hoyos
Houses completed in the 19th century
Art Nouveau architecture in Vienna
Art Nouveau houses
Otto Wagner buildings
Diplomatic missions of Croatia
Austria–Serbia relations
Austria–Croatia relations